The United States U-20 women's national soccer team is a youth soccer team operated under the auspices of U.S. Soccer.  Its primary role is the development of players in preparation for the senior women's national team.  The team most recently appeared in the 2018 FIFA U-20 Women's World Cup in France, where they failed to progress from the group stage for the first time in the competition's history. The team competes in a variety of competitions, including the biennial FIFA U-20 Women's World Cup, which is the top competition for this age group.

History

Beginnings as a U-18 program
The United States U-20 team has been active since 1998; however, it was run as a U-18 team from its inception until 2001.  It was led by Shannon Higgins-Cirovski, the first coach in the team's history, through the middle of 1999 before she left for the Maryland Terrapins soccer team.  Jay Hoffman, who served as Higgins-Cirovski's assistant, took charge of the team and led them to a gold medal for the 1999 Pan American Games, the first time the tournament was open to women's teams. Among the U-18 women playing at the 1999 Pan American Games were future senior national team members Cat Whitehill and Hope Solo.

The switch to U-19

2001 through 2003
In 2001, the United States Soccer Federation decided to change the age limit from the U-18 team to U-19.  The move was in preparation for FIFA's introduction of the first ever FIFA U-19 Women's World Championship (which has since changed).  The new U-19 squad won the inaugural 2002 FIFA U-19 Women's World Championship in Canada, where they beat the hosts on a golden goal by captain and future United States women's national team mainstay Lindsay Tarpley. Five other members of that same team would join Tarpley as teammates on the senior international team: Rachel Buehler, Lori Chalupny, Heather O'Reilly, Leslie Osborne and Angie Woznuk.  Other notable 2002 team members were Kelly Wilson, the all-time leading goal scorer in the history of the U-20 team, as well as two-time Hermann Trophy winner Kerri Hanks, who would go on to become one of the most decorated players in women's collegiate soccer.

2004
In 2004, the U-19 team placed third at the 2004 FIFA U-19 Women's World Championship in Thailand, after having been defeated by Germany in the semifinals. The tournament marked the world championship debut of future senior national team members Yael Averbuch, Stephanie Lopez, Amy Rodriguez and Megan Rapinoe.  However, in 2006, FIFA increased the age limit of the FIFA U-19 Women's World Championship to 20. 2004 also saw the first loss to a similar-aged team in the history of the program when the squad lost to Japan.

Competing as a U-20 team

2005 and 2006
As the United States Soccer Federation did in 2001 prior to the introduction of the U-19 tournament, they raised the age of the squad from U-19 to U-20 in 2005.  The move was, again, in response to FIFA's altering of the competition from U-19 to U-20.  The actual team's play in 2005 was quiet due to a transition in coaches.

In 2006, the United States U-20 team played in a whopping 50 matches prior to the 2006 FIFA U-20 Women's World Championship in Russia; however, the team finished in fourth place.  The U.S. lost to China in penalties in the semifinal and followed up the loss with another to Brazil in the third-place match, also on penalties.  Seven members of that 2006 team: Lauren Cheney, Christina DiMartino, Tobin Heath, Stephanie Lopez, Casey Nogueira, Kelley O'Hara and Amy Rodriguez, have made appearances for the senior national team.  Lopez played in the 2007 FIFA Women's World Cup, and, joined by Cheney, Heath and Rodriguez, also represented the United States at the 2008 Summer Olympics.  Nogueira and O'Hara helped the 2008 U-20 team to qualify for the 2008 FIFA U-20 Women's World Cup that same year.

2007 and 2008
2007 saw the squad sent to the 2007 Pan American Games, just as they had done prior in the 1999 Pan American Games.  This time around, the United States sent along two "over-aged players" in Lauren Cheney and Brittany Taylor.  The decision proved costly as the supplemented U-20 team were dismantled in the finals, 5–0, to a full-strength Brazil squad.

In 2008, two years removed from the disastrous fourth-place finish at the 2006 U-20 World Championship, the United States U-20 women finally reclaimed the World Cup title at the 2008 FIFA U-20 Women's World Cup in Chile, with Sydney Leroux winning the Golden Ball and Golden Shoe for being named the best player of the tournament as well as scoring the most goals.  Alex Morgan earned  the Silver Shoe as the tournament's second-highest scorer and the Silver Ball as the tournament's second-best player behind teammate Leroux. To date, Alex Morgan, Sydney Leroux, Christine Nairn, Alyssa Naeher, and Meghan Klingenberg are the only members of the 2008 squad to be capped by the senior national team.

2009 and 2010
In 2009, Tony DiCicco handed the coaching reins back to Jill Ellis, who had coached the 2007 Pan American Games squad. 2009 also saw the influx of players who took part in the inaugural FIFA U-17 Women's World Cup into the U-20s, including Kristen Mewis, US Soccer's 2008 Young Female Player of the Year, and Vicki DiMartino, younger sister of U-20 alumni Christina (2006) and Gina (2007–2008). Two members of the 2008 squad, Sydney Leroux and Christine Nairn, returned to captain the team through the next World Cup cycle.

The team won the 2010 CONCACAF Under-20 Women's Championship title the next year and secured a berth to the 2010 FIFA U-20 Women's World Cup, to be held in Germany. Sydney Leroux was the leading scorer at the tournament with six goals. In the World Cup, they won their group, but lost on penalty kicks to Nigeria in the quarterfinals. Leroux was again their leading scorer, tallying five goals in their four matches.

2011 and 2012
In 2011, Steve Swanson was named coach of the squad for the second time, after having coached in 2000.  To prepare for the 2012 FIFA U-20 Women's World Cup in Japan, the team played 8 friendlies (winning seven) and qualifying with ease for the World Cup, scoring 24 goals in the qualifying tournament, while conceding only once.

In the World Cup, the squad was led by a Maya Hayes hat trick en route to beating Ghana 4–0.  After a 1–1 draw against China, and a 3–0 loss to Germany, the US qualified for the quarterfinals over China on goal differential.  In the quarterfinals, Chioma Ubogagu scored in extra time in a 2–1 victory over North Korea.  In the semifinal, Morgan Brian and Kealia Ohai scored in a 2–0 win over Nigeria.  The final was a rematch with Germany. Ohai scored right before halftime, and the US held on for a 1–0 win and their third World Cup championship.

2013 and 2014
Following the 2012 World Cup win, Michelle French took over the U-20 program.  Defenders Cari Roccaro and Stephanie Amack returned from the 2012 World Cup winning side to lead the team along with Paris Saint-Germain target woman Lindsey Horan, the first American woman to skip college and turn professional, and Andi Sullivan, who was named co-captain despite being the youngest player on the squad during qualifiers.  The US team again coasted through the CONCACAF qualifying tournament, winning all 5 matches without even conceding a single goal.  However, the World Cup would offer much greater resistance as they started out in the Group of Death with international powerhouses Germany, Brazil, and China.

The World Cup tournament would feature a large sense of deja vu from two years prior, with the Americans grouped with China and Germany again.  The US opened in a rematch of the previous final against Germany, this time coming up short, losing 2–0.  But in a similar manner that they had in the previous World Cup, they survived the group stage with wins against Brazil and China behind strong performances by Lindsey Horan and central midfielder Rose Lavelle.  The second-place finish in their group would match them for the second tournament in a row against North Korea and as they had two years before, the match went into extra time.  Unfortunately for the Americans, this time the winning magic was not to be found as the game went into a shootout from the penalty spot and the Korean keeper dominated.  Savannah Jordan, Lindsey Horan, and Rose Lavelle were all denied by Korean keeper Kim on weak efforts from the spot and the Americans exited the tournament earlier than expected.

2016–present 
In 2016, the team participated in the 2016 FIFA U-20 Women's World Cup, and made it to the semifinals, where they lost to North Korea again in extra time. They then lost to Japan in the third-place match.

In February 2017, US Soccer reassigned Michelle French to be a full-time assistant coach for the senior women's national team, with Jitka Klimková replacing her as head coach in April 2017.

The team finished runners-up in the 2018 CONCACAF Women's U-20 Championship. In the 2018 FIFA U-20 Women's World Cup, the team failed to progress from the group stage for the first time in history.

Competitive record

FIFA U-20 Women's World Cup

CONCACAF Women's U-20 Championship tournament record
The U-20 women have won the CONCACAF Women's U-20 Championship six times, in 2006, 2010, 2012, 2014, 2015 and 2020; the 2002 tournament did not have a championship final. The U-20s finished as runners-up to Canada in 2004 and 2008 and to Mexico in 2018.

Pan American Games
The under-18 team participated and won the inaugural soccer tournament in the 1999 Pan American Games, while the under-20 team lost in the final of the 2007 Pan American Games, competing against full national teams. These opportunities are a consequence of holding the FIFA Women's World Cup in the same year as the Pan American Games.

Players

Current squad

20 players were named to the squad for the 2022 FIFA U-20 Women's World Cup.

Caps and goals are current as of August 17, 2022, after match against .

Recent call-ups
The following players were named to a squad in the last 12 months.
 2022 Sud Ladies Cup

 Friendlies v. ; May 15 and 18, 2022
 2022 CONCACAF Women's U-20 Championship
 Training camp; October 17–24, 2021

Previous major tournament rosters
2018 FIFA U-20 Women's World Cup squad

2016 FIFA U-20 Women's World Cup squad

2014 FIFA U-20 Women's World Cup squad

2012 FIFA U-20 Women's World Cup squad

2010 FIFA U-20 Women's World Cup squad

2008 FIFA U-20 Women's World Cup squad

2007 Pan American Games squad

2006 FIFA U-20 Women's World Championship squad

2004 FIFA U-19 Women's World Championship squad

2002 FIFA U-19 Women's World Championship squad

Player records
International match statistics, as of August 12, 2014. All goals scored in international matches only.

Players still eligible for the U-20 player pool in bold.

Coaches
  Shannon Higgins-Cirovski (1998–1999)
  Jay Hoffman (1999)
  Steve Swanson (2000)
  Tracey Leone (2001–2004)
  Mark Krikorian (2004–2005)
  Tim Schulz (2005–2006)
  Jill Ellis (2007)
  Tony DiCicco (2008)
  Jill Ellis (2009–2010)
  Dave Chesler (2010–2011)
  Steve Swanson (2011–2012)
  Michelle French (2013–2017)
  Jitka Klimková (2017–2019)
  Mark Carr (2019)
  Laura Harvey (2020–2021)
  Tracey Kevins (2021–)

References

Youth soccer in the United States
North American women's national under-20 association football teams
Soc
U20
U20